Popasna Raion was a raion (district) in Luhansk Oblast of eastern Ukraine. The administrative center was the town of Popasna. The raion was abolished on 18 July 2020 as part of the administrative reform of Ukraine, which reduced the number of raions of Luhansk Oblast to eight, of which only four were controlled by the government.

During the War in Donbass the Ukrainian authorities lost control over parts of the raion to the Lugansk People's Republic.

On 7 October 2014, to facilitate the governance of Luhansk Oblast, the Verkhovna Rada made some changes in the administrative divisions, so that the localities in the government-controlled areas were grouped into districts. In particular, the urban-type settlement of Chornukhyne was transferred to Popasna Raion from Perevalsk Raion, the urban-type settlement of Novotoshkivske from Kirovsk Municipality, and the towns of Hirske and Zolote and the urban-type settlements of Nyzhnie and Toshkivka from Pervomaisk Municipality. The part of Popasna Raion under control of the Lugansk People's Republic were transferred to other administrative units as well before the entirety of the Raion was taken from the forces of the Ukraine.

Demographics 
As of the 2001 Ukrainian census:

Ethnicity
 Ukrainians: 81.1%
 Russians: 17.5%
 Belarusians: 0.5%

References

Former raions of Luhansk Oblast
1977 establishments in Ukraine
Ukrainian raions abolished during the 2020 administrative reform